Andrea Gámiz and Valeria Savinykh were the defending champions, however Gámiz chose not to participate. Savinykh partnered Xenia Knoll, but lost in the first round.

The top seeds María Irigoyen and Paula Kania won the title, defeating second seeds Julie Coin and Stéphanie Foretz in the final, 6–1, 6–3.

Seeds

Draw

References 
 Draw

Nana Trophy - Doubles